Koma is a rural locality (a selo) in Pribaykalsky District, Republic of Buryatia, Russia. The population was 743 as of 2010. There are 13 streets.

Geography 
Itantsa is the nearest rural locality.

References 

Rural localities in Okinsky District